Alpha is a series of reprint science fiction anthologies edited by Robert Silverberg, published as paperback originals from 1970 to 1978 by Ballantine Books and Berkley Publishing. Ballantine published volumes annually from 1970 through 1974, while Berkley resumed the series with four volumes from 1976 through 1978. All five of the Ballantine volumes placed in the top ten in an anthology category in the annual Locus Poll, as did the final Berkley volume. Theodore Sturgeon and Gerald Jonas reviewed books in the series for The New York Times Book Review.

Alpha 1 - Ballantine, September 1970; Corgi, December 1971 (UK)
Alpha 2 - Ballantine, November 1971
Alpha 3 - Ballantine, October 1972
Alpha 4 - Ballantine, October 1973
Alpha 5 - Ballantine, August 1974
Alpha 6 - Berkley, April 1976
Alpha 7 - Berkley, July 1977
Alpha 8 - Berkley, November 1977
Alpha 9 - Berkley, October 1978

References 

Science fiction anthologies